The 2021 European Baseball Championship was an international baseball tournament organized by the Confederation of European Baseball. The 2021 Championship was held September 12–19, 2021, in Turin, Italy.

Qualification 

The 12 teams of the 2019 European Championship qualified automatically for the tournament. Four additional teams, Russia, Ukraine, Slovakia, and Greece, qualified from the 17-team B-Pool tournament.

Group stage

Group A

Group B

Group C

Group D

Play-offs

Quarter-finals

Semi-finals

Bronze-medal

Final

Placement round 5th–8th place

Classification games

7th place

5th place

Relegation rounds

Relegation round

9–12th places classification

11th place

9th place

13–16th places classification

15th place

13th place

Final standings

Statistics leaders

Batting

* Minimum 2.7 plate appearances per game

Pitching

* Minimum 1.0 inning pitched per game

References

External links
Official website

2021
European Championships
European Baseball Championship
Sports competitions in Turin
International sports competitions hosted by Italy
European Baseball Championship